Miroslav Beránek (born 24 April 1957) is a Czech football coach who was most recently the manager of the Slavia Prague. As a player, he played over 100 matches as a defender for Slavia Prague in the 1980s.

Coaching career
Beránek took charge of Slavia Prague in the 1994–95 season. After managing Chmel Blšany in the Czech First League, he returned for a second spell at Slavia, where he won the 2001–02 Czech Cup.

As coach of the Czech Republic U21 team, he won the 2002 UEFA European Under-21 Football Championship. He has also coached several Czech clubs and worked abroad in Hungary, the United Arab Emirates and Kazakhstan.

Beránek returned to manage Slavia in 2014 following 11 years away from the club.

Honours

Coach
Chmel Blšany
 Druhá liga (1): 1997–98
Slavia Prague
 Czech Cup (1): 2001–02
Czech Republic U-21
UEFA European Under-21 Championship (1): 2002
Debreceni VSC
 Nemzeti Bajnokság I (1): 2006–07
Astana
 Kazakhstan Cup (1): 2012

References 

1957 births
Living people
People from Benešov
Czech footballers
Czechoslovak footballers
SK Slavia Prague players
Czech football managers
Czechoslovak football managers
Czech First League managers
Kazakhstan national football team managers
SK Slavia Prague managers
SK Kladno managers
Debreceni VSC managers
Al-Wasl F.C. managers
FC Zbrojovka Brno managers
FC Astana managers
Association football defenders
Czech expatriate football managers
Nemzeti Bajnokság I managers
Sportspeople from the Central Bohemian Region